The following is a list of Charleston Southern Buccaneers men's basketball head coaches. There have been 12 head coaches of the Buccaneers in their 58-season history.

Charleston Southern's current head coach is Barclay Radebaugh. He was hired as the Buccaneers' head coach in May 2005, replacing Jim Platt, who resigned after the 2004–05 season to join the staff at Army as an assistant coach.

References

Charleston Southern

Charleston Southern Buccaneers men's basketball coaches